The Anhui Laomingguang Stadium (Simplified Chinese: 安徽老明光体育场) or Anhui Provincial People's Stadium (Simplified Chinese: 安徽省人民体育场) is a multi-use stadium in Hefei, Anhui, China.  It is currently used mostly for football matches and athletics events.  The stadium has a capacity of 20,000 people.  It is used primarily by Anhui Jiufang.

References

Football venues in China
Sports venues in Anhui